The 2012–13 1. FC Köln season was the 64th season in club history. In the 2012–13 season, the club played in the 2. Bundesliga; the second tier of German football. It was the club's first season back in this league, after being relegated from the Bundesliga in 2012. The season started on 5 August 2012 and ended on 19 May 2013.

Review and events

Season

The club is taking part of the 2012–13 edition of the 2. Bundesliga and the 2012–13 edition of the DFB-Pokal. The season started on 5 August 2012 with a loss against Eintracht Braunschweig and  ended on 19 May 2013 against Ingolstadt 04.

The club started their league season with a six-match winless streak. Their first league win came against FSV Frankfurt on matchday seven. Overall, The first victory came against SpVgg Unterhaching in the opening round of the cup.

Holger Stanislawski was hired as the new head coach on 14 May 2012.

Discipline
1. FC Köln was hit with a €50,000 fine. The club was only allowed to sell 15.000 tickets to its own supporters and a maximum of 5.000 tickets to supporters of SV Sandhausen. The club stated that this is an economic loss of approximately €500,000. The club appealed the decision and will only pay €40,000 fine and the maximum number of tickets that can be sold  to its own supporters was increased to 22.500.

Financial problems
There have been repeated rumours about the club being in a grave financial situation. In a letter to club supporters, the club stated "The current financial position of the 1st FC Köln is serious. However, we also want to use this letter to continually eliminate repeated rumors that are without substance. An over-dramatizing the situation is just as damaging as to trivialize it." The club stated that they'll be using revenue bonds for debt restructuring.

Problem supporters
Supporters of the club went to the home of Kevin Pezzoni and harassed and threatened him.  Pezzoni's car was "smeared." There was an anti-Pezzoni Group on Facebook where more than 400 people joined. This isn't the first case where club supporters went to the home of a 1. FC Köln footballer. Club supporters went to Pedro Geromel's home during the night. Pezzoni had his contract dissolved because of the incident. Pezzoni stated that he didn't want to terminate his contract and had hoped that the club would stand behind him against the problem supporters.

Chronology of events

Match results and fixtures

Legend

2. Bundesliga

League results and fixtures

Table

Overall league table

Results summary

DFB-Pokal

Squad information

Squad and statistics

Squad, appearances and goals

Source:

|-
! colspan="10" style="background:#dcdcdc; text-align:center;"| Goalkeepers

|-
! colspan="10" style="background:#dcdcdc; text-align:center;"| Defenders

|-
! colspan="10" style="background:#dcdcdc; text-align:center;"| Midfielders

|-
! colspan="10" style="background:#dcdcdc; text-align:center;"| Strikers

|-
! colspan="10" style="background:#dcdcdc; text-align:center;"| No longer at club

|}

Bookings

Sources:

Transfers

In

Out

Notes
1.Times are in the CET/CEST.
2.1. FC Köln goals listed first.
3.Players who were in the squad at the time of the first competitive fixture; but have left the club or loan out since.

Sources

Match reports

Other sources

External links
 2012–13 1. FC Köln season at Weltfussball.de 
 2012–13 1. FC Köln season at kicker.de 
 2012–13 1. FC Köln season at Fussballdaten.de 

Koln
1. FC Köln seasons